Ata Mariota (born 28 December 2001) is a Samoan professional rugby league footballer who currently plays for the Canberra Raiders in the National Rugby League.

Background
Mariota was born in Apia, Samoa.

He played his junior rugby league for the Manurewa Marlins before being signed by the Canberra Raiders.

Career

2022
In round 21 of the 2022 NRL season, Mariota made his first grade debut for Canberra against the Penrith Panthers. He entered the game as a concussion replacement (18th man) for Ryan Sutton after he failed his HIA.

References

External links
https://www.raiders.com.au/teams/telstra-premiership/canberra-raiders/ata-mariota/ Canberra Raiders profile]

2001 births
Living people
New Zealand sportspeople of Samoan descent
New Zealand rugby league players
Canberra Raiders players
Rugby league props